Lee Chang-Hoon (21 March 1935 – 13 January 2004) was a Korean former long-distance runner who competed in the 1956 Summer Olympics and in the 1960 Summer Olympics.

References

1935 births
2004 deaths
South Korean male long-distance runners
Olympic athletes of South Korea
Athletes (track and field) at the 1956 Summer Olympics
Athletes (track and field) at the 1960 Summer Olympics
Asian Games medalists in athletics (track and field)
Athletes (track and field) at the 1958 Asian Games
South Korean male marathon runners
Asian Games gold medalists for South Korea
Medalists at the 1958 Asian Games